Hwapyong County is a kun, or county, in Chagang Province, North Korea.  It was incorporated as a new county as part of a general reorganization of local government in December 1952.  Previously it had been part of Chasong and Huchang.

Administrative divisions 
Hwapyong-gun is divided into one town (ŭp), 3 workers' districts (rodongjagu) and 10 villages (ri).

See also
Geography of North Korea
Administrative divisions of North Korea
Chagang

References

External links

Counties of Chagang